This is a list of academic conferences in computer science. Only conferences with separate articles are included; within each field, the conferences are listed alphabetically by their short names.

General

 FCRC – Federated Computing Research Conference

Algorithms and theory

Conferences accepting a broad range of topics from theoretical computer science, including algorithms, data structures, computability, computational complexity, automata theory and formal languages:

 CCC - Computational Complexity Conference
 FCT – International Symposium on Fundamentals of Computation Theory
 FOCS – IEEE Symposium on Foundations of Computer Science
 ICALP – International Colloquium on Automata, Languages and Programming
 ISAAC – International Symposium on Algorithms and Computation
 MFCS – International Symposium on Mathematical Foundations of Computer Science
 STACS – Symposium on Theoretical Aspects of Computer Science
 STOC – ACM Symposium on Theory of Computing
 WoLLIC – Workshop on Logic, Language, Information and Computation

Algorithms
Conferences whose topic is algorithms and data structures considered broadly, but that do not include other areas of theoretical computer science such as computational complexity theory:

 ESA – European Symposium on Algorithms
 SODA – ACM–SIAM Symposium on Discrete Algorithms
 SWAT – Scandinavian Symposium and Workshops on Algorithm Theory
 WADS – Algorithms and Data Structures Symposium
 WAOA – Workshop on Approximation and Online Algorithms

Geometric algorithms
Conferences on computational geometry, graph drawing, and other application areas of geometric computing:
 GD – International Symposium on Graph Drawing
 SoCG – ACM Symposium on Computational Geometry

Logic 

 LICS – ACM–IEEE Symposium on Logic in Computer Science
 RTA – International Conference on Rewriting Techniques and Applications

Other specialized subtopics
 CIAA – International Conference on Implementation and Application of Automata
 CCC – Computational Complexity Conference
 DCFS – International Workshop on Descriptional Complexity of Formal Systems
 DLT – International Conference on Developments in Language Theory
 ISSAC – International Symposium on Symbolic and Algebraic Computation
 Petri Nets - International Conference on Applications and Theory of Petri Nets and Concurrency
 RP – International Conference on Reachability Problems
 SEA – Symposium on Experimental Algorithms

Languages and software

Programming languages 
Conferences on programming languages, programming language theory and compilers:
 CC International Conference on Compiler Construction
 ECOOP – AITO European Conference on Object-Oriented Programming
 ESOP – ETAPS European Symposium on Programming
 HOPL – ACM SIGPLAN History of Programming Languages Conference
 ICFP – ACM SIGPLAN International Conference on Functional Programming
 ICLP – ALP International Conference on Logic Programming
 ISMM – ACM SIGPLAN International Symposium on Memory Management
 OOPSLA – ACM SIGPLAN Conference on Object-Oriented Programming, Systems, Languages, and Applications
 POPL – ACM SIGPLAN-SIGACT Symposium on Principles of Programming Languages
 PLDI – ACM SIGPLAN Conference on Programming Language Design and Implementation

Software engineering 
Conferences on software engineering:
 ASE – IEEE/ACM International Conference on Automated Software Engineering
 ICSE – International Conference on Software Engineering
 ICSR – International Conference on Software Reuse
TACAS - ETAPS International Conference on Tools and Algorithms for the Construction and Analysis of Systems
FoSSaCS - ETAPS International Conference on Foundations of Software Science and Computation Structures
FASE - ETAPS International Conference on Fundamental Approaches to Software Engineering

Formal methods 

Conferences on formal methods in software engineering, including formal specification, formal verification, and static code analysis:
 CAV – Computer Aided Verification
 FORTE – IFIP International Conference on Formal Techniques for Networked and Distributed Systems

Concurrent, distributed and parallel computing

Conferences on concurrent, distributed, and parallel computing, fault-tolerant systems, and dependable systems:
 CONCUR - International Conference on Concurrency Theory
 DEBS - ACM International Conference on Distributed Event-Based Systems
 DISC - International Symposium on Distributed Computing
 DSN - International Conference on Dependable Systems and Networks
 ICDCS - IEEE International Conference on Distributed Computing Systems
 ICPADS - IEEE International Conference on Parallel and Distributed Systems
 IPDPS - IEEE International Parallel and Distributed Processing Symposium
 PODC - ACM Symposium on Principles of Distributed Computing
 PPoPP - ACM SIGPLAN Symposium on Principles and Practice of Parallel Programming
 SIROCCO - International Colloquium on Structural Information and Communication Complexity
 SPAA - ACM Symposium on Parallelism in Algorithms and Architectures
 SRDS - IEEE International Symposium on Reliable Distributed Systems

High-performance computing

Conferences on high-performance computing, cluster computing, and grid computing:
 ICS - International Conference on Supercomputing
 HiPC - International Conference on High Performance Computing
 SC - ACM/IEEE Supercomputing Conference

Operating systems

Conferences on operating systems, storage systems and middleware:

 ATC - USENIX Annual Technical Conference
 FAST - USENIX Conference on File and Storage Technologies
 Middleware - ACM/IFIP/USENIX International Middleware Conference
 SOSP - ACM Symposium on Operating Systems Principles
 SYSTOR - ACM International Systems and Storage Conference

Computer architecture

Conferences on computer architecture:

 ASPLOS - International Conference on Architectural Support for Programming Languages and Operating Systems
 ISCA - International Symposium on Computer Architecture
 MICRO - IEEE/ACM International Symposium on Microarchitecture

Computer hardware

Conferences on computer hardware:

 ISCAS - IEEE International Symposium on Circuits and Systems

Computer-aided design

Conferences on computer-aided design and electronic design automation:

 ASP-DAC - Asia and South Pacific Design Automation Conference
 DAC - Design Automation Conference
 DATE - Design, Automation, and Test in Europe
 ICCAD - International Conference on Computer-Aided Design
 ISPD - International Symposium on Physical Design

Computer networking 

Conferences on computer networking:

 GlobeCom - IEEE Global Communications Conference
 ICC - IEEE International Conference on Communications
 ICSOC - International Conference on Service Oriented Computing
 INFOCOM - IEEE Conference on Computer Communications
 SIGCOMM - ACM SIGCOMM Conference
 SIGMETRICS - ACM SIGMETRICS
 WINE - The Workshop on Internet & Network Economics

Wireless networks and mobile computing

Wireless networks and mobile computing, including ubiquitous and pervasive computing, wireless ad hoc networks and wireless sensor networks:

 EWSN - European Conference on Wireless Sensor Networks
 IPSN - ACM/IEEE International Conference on Information Processing in Sensor Networks
 ISWC - International Symposium on Wearable Computers
 MobiHoc - ACM International Symposium on Mobile Ad Hoc Networking and Computing
 SenSys - ACM Conference on Embedded Networked Sensor Systems

Security and privacy

Conferences on computer security and privacy:
 DSN - International Conference on Dependable Systems and Networks
 USENIX Security Symposium

Cryptography

Cryptography conferences:

 ANTS - Algorithmic Number Theory Symposium
 ASIACRYPT - International Conference on the Theory and Application of Cryptology and Information Security
 CHES - Workshop on Cryptographic Hardware and Embedded Systems
 CRYPTO - International Cryptology Conference
 EUROCRYPT - International Conference on the Theory and Applications of Cryptographic Techniques
 FSE - Fast Software Encryption Workshop
 PKC - International Workshop on Practice and Theory in Public Key Cryptography
 RSA - RSA Conference
 TCC - Theory of Cryptography Conference

Data management

Conferences on databases, information systems, information retrieval, data mining and the World Wide Web:

 CIDR - Conference on Innovative Data Systems Research
 CIKM - ACM Conference on Information and Knowledge Management
 ECIR - European Conference on Information Retrieval
 ECIS - European Conference on Information Systems
 ER - International Conference on Conceptual Modeling
 ICDT - International Conference on Database Theory
 ICIS - International Conference on Information Systems
 ISWC - International Semantic Web Conference
 JCDL - ACM/IEEE Joint Conference on Digital Libraries
 KDD - ACM SIGKDD Conference on Knowledge Discovery and Data Mining
 PODS - ACM Symposium on Principles of Database Systems
 SIGIR - Annual International ACM SIGIR Conference
 SIGMOD - ACM SIGMOD Conference
 VLDB - International Conference on Very Large Data Bases
 WWW - World Wide Web Conference

Artificial intelligence

Conferences on artificial intelligence and machine learning:

 AAAI - AAAI Conference on Artificial Intelligence
 AAMAS - International Conference on Autonomous Agents and Multiagent Systems
 CIBB - International Conference on Computational Intelligence Methods for Bioinformatics and Biostatistics
 ECAI - European Conference on Artificial Intelligence
 ECML PKDD - European Conference on Machine Learning and Principles and Practice of Knowledge Discovery in Databases
 ICML - International Conference on Machine Learning
 ICLR - International Conference on Learning Representations
 IJCAI - International Joint Conference on Artificial Intelligence
 ISWC - International Semantic Web Conference
 NeurIPS - Conference on Neural Information Processing Systems
 RuleML - RuleML Symposium

Evolutionary computation 
Conferences on Evolutionary computation.
 AE - Artificial Evolution Conference
 CEC - IEEE Congress on Evolutionary Computation
 GECCO - Genetic and Evolutionary Computation Conference

Automated reasoning

Conferences on automated reasoning:
 IJCAR - International Joint Conference on Automated Reasoning
 LPAR - International Conference on Logic for Programming, Artificial Intelligence and Reasoning
 RuleML - RuleML Symposium
 TABLEAUX - International Conference on Automated Reasoning with Analytic Tableaux and Related Methods
 WoLLIC - Workshop on Logic, Language, Information and Computation

Computer vision

Conferences on computer vision (including also image analysis) and pattern recognition:
 BMVC - British Machine Vision Conference
 CVPR - IEEE Conference on Computer Vision and Pattern Recognition
 ECCV - European Conference on Computer Vision
 SCIA - Scandinavian Conference on Image Analysis
 SSIAI - IEEE Southwest Symposium on Image Analysis and Interpretation

Natural language processing

Conferences on computational linguistics and natural language processing:

 ACL - Annual Meeting of the Association for Computational Linguistics
 EMNLP - Empirical Methods in Natural Language Processing
 NAACL - Annual Conference of the North American Chapter of the Association for Computational Linguistics
 COLING - International Committee on Computational Linguistics
 TSD - Text, Speech and Dialogue
 CICLing - International Conference on Intelligent Text Processing and Computational Linguistics

Computer graphics

Conferences on computer graphics, geometry processing, image processing, and multimedia:
 Eurographics - Annual Conference of the European Association for Computer Graphics
 MM - ACM International Conference on Multimedia
 SGP - Symposium on Geometry Processing
 SIGGRAPH - International Conference on Computer Graphics and Interactive Techniques

Visualization
Conferences on visual analytics, scientific visualization and information visualization:
 VIS - IEEE Visualization Conference

Human–computer interaction

Conferences on human–computer interaction and user interfaces:

 ASSETS - International ACM SIGACCESS Conference on Computers and Accessibility
 CHI - ACM Conference on Human Factors in Computing Systems
 GI - Graphics Interface
 MobileHCI - Conference on Human-Computer Interaction with Mobile Devices and Services
 SIGDOC - ACM International Conference on Design of Communication
 UIST - ACM Symposium on User Interface Software and Technology
 UMAP - ACM International Conference on User Modeling, Adaptation, and Personalization

Bioinformatics and computational biology

Conferences on bioinformatics and computational biology:
 CIBB - International Conference on Computational Intelligence Methods for Bioinformatics and Biostatistics
 ISMB - Intelligent Systems for Molecular Biology
 PSB - Pacific Symposium on Biocomputing
 RECOMB - Research in Computational Molecular Biology
 WABI - Workshop on Algorithms in Bioinformatics

Education

Conferences on computer science education and electronic learning:

 SIGCSE - ACM Technical Symposium on Computer Science Education

See also
 List of computer science conference acronyms
 List of computer science journals
 List of publications in computer science
 Outline of computer science

External links
 DBLP database with conferences and workshops
 List of computer science conferences ranked by h-index

Computing-related lists
Lists of conferences